The 1976 USC Trojans football team represented the University of Southern California (USC) in the 1976 NCAA Division I football season. In their first year under head coach John Robinson, the Trojans compiled an 11–1 record (7–0 against conference opponents), won the Pacific-8 Conference (Pac-8) championship, defeated Michigan in the 1977 Rose Bowl, and outscored their opponents by a combined total of 386 to 139. The team was ranked #2 in both the final AP Poll and the final UPI Coaches Poll.

Quarterback Vince Evans led the team in passing, completing 95 of 177 passes for 1,440 yards with ten touchdowns and six interceptions.  Ricky Bell led the team in rushing with 280 carries for 1,433 yards and 14 touchdowns. Shelton Diggs led the team in receiving with 37 catches for 655 yards and eight touchdowns.

The team was named national champion by Berryman, Billingsley MOV, DeVold, Dunkel, Football Research, and Matthews, all NCAA-designated major selectors.

Schedule

Roster

Game summaries

Missouri

at Oregon

at Purdue

Iowa

at Washington State

Oregon State

California

at Stanford

Washington

vs. UCLA

Notre Dame

Ricky Bell was held to 75 yards on 21 carries but USC's passing game thrived with Vince Evans completing six of his 14 passes for 106 yards with Randy Simmrin hauling in six passes for 121 yards and Evans' touchdown pass.

Rose Bowl (vs Michigan)

References

External links
 Game program: USC vs. Washington State at Seattle – October 9, 1976

USC
USC Trojans football seasons
Pac-12 Conference football champion seasons
Rose Bowl champion seasons
USC Trojans football